The Cithrinchen or Bell cittern was a distinctively shaped instrument of the renaissance and baroque periods. It was usually strung with doubled courses of thin, light tension brass or steel strings. It usually had 3 soundholes (with decorative roses) and 5 (or sometimes 6 or more) courses (pairs) of strings. It was popular in Germany, England and Sweden. 

Most such instruments built nowadays are reconstructions of historical instruments, or modern mandolin-type instruments which simply use the same body shape as the historical Cithrinchen.

Gallery

References

Early musical instruments
String instruments